Niagara-Wheatfield Central School District is a public school district in New York State located in the Town of Lewiston, New York, about  from Niagara Falls, New York. The District serves students from the towns of Niagara and Wheatfield.

Administration 

 Daniel Ljiljanich–Superintendent 

 Thomas Stack–Assistant Superintendent Personnel & Pupil Services

 Dr. Allison Davis–Assistant Superintendent of Finance and Management

 Jeffery D. Hazel,–Director of Curriculum, Instruction, and Technology 

 Jennifer Golias,–Assistant Director of Curriculum, Instruction, and Technology 

 Dr. Steve Metzger,–Director of Special Programs 

 Casie La Marca,–Assistant Director of Special Programs

 Matthew McKenna,–Director of Athletics

Selected former superintendents 
Previous assignment and reason for departure in parentheses
Mabel Sarbaugh Lee
Charles R. Clark
Joel Radin–?-1994 (unknown, retired)
Carol Beebe–1994-1996 (Principal - Colonial Village Elementary, returned to Colonial Village)
Peter T. Kachris–1996-1997 [interim]
Judith H. Howard–1998-2008 (Assistant Superintendent - Hilton Central School District, retired)
Carl Militello–2008-2012 (Superintendent - Carthage Central School District, retired)
Kerin Dumphrey–2012 [interim] (School Business Administrator - Niagara-Wheatfield Central School District, returned to position)
James Knowles–2012-2013 [interim] (Interim Superintendent - Warsaw Central School District, retired)
Lynn M. Fusco–2013-2015 (Superintendent - Alden Central School District, named Superintendent of Erie 1 BOCES)

Schools
The school district operates six schools.

Niagara-Wheatfield High School 

Niagara-Wheatfield High School is located at 2292 Saunders Settlement Road in Sanborn, New York and serves grades 9 through 12. The current interim principal is Jeffrey White.

History 
Niagara Wheatfield High School was built and opened on September 8, 1958.

Edward Town Middle School 

Edward Town Middle School is located at 2292 Sanders Settlement Road in Sanborn and serves grades 6, 7, and 8. The current principal is Eleanor Payne.

History 
Edward Town Middle School was built in 1964 and opened in 1965. It was named for Edward Town in October 1965/April 1966, who helped organize the Niagara Wheatfield district.

Colonial Village Elementary School 

Colonial Village Elementary School is located in Lewiston, and is located at 1456 Saunders Settlement Road. It serves grades K through 5. The current principal is Marissa Vuich.

Errick Road Elementary 

Errick Road Elementary School is located at 6839 Errick Road in Wheatfield and serves grades K through 5. The current principal is Nora O'Bryan.

Tuscarora Indian School 

Tuscarora Indian School is located at 2015 Mt. Hope Street in Lewiston and serves grades K through 6. The current principal is Elizabeth Corieri.

West Street Elementary 

West Street Elementary School is located at 5700 West Street in Sanborn and serves grades K through 5. The current principal is Theron Mong.

History 
West Street Elementary School was built and opened on September 9, 1998.

School colors and mascot
Niagara-Wheatfield Senior High School's official school colors are black & white and red. The school's mascot is the Falcon, and its sports teams and other competitive teams are also referred to as the "Niagara-Wheafield Falcons."

Academic and behavioral statistics
Overall, Niagara-Wheatfield Central School District's academic and behavioral statistics are higher than the New York State average. In 2006 the average attendance rate for all high school students was 93%. Total suspension count for the year was 94 incidents. 96% of the Class of 2006 earned New York State Regents diplomas, while only 4% earned local diplomas. 56.8% of total students earned New York State Regents diplomas with advanced designations (honors). 69.2% of students with disabilities earned New York State Regents diplomas.

Sports and academic organizations
Athletics: NW has an array of sports programs, including baseball, football, basketball, bowling, wrestling, cheer-leading, track, cross country, tennis, volleyball, swimming, golf, soccer, hockey and softball. Niagara-Wheatfield competes in the NFL (Niagara Frontier League) with rival schools such as Lewiston-Porter, Niagara Falls, and Lockport. Niagara-Wheatfield is in New York's Section 6.

Academic Organizations:
Niagara-Wheatfield also offers a wide variety of other organizations that students can join based on their interests.

Notable alumni
Rashad Evans

Post-high school career paths
The majority of each year's graduating classes go on to pursue two and four-year college-level degrees. 38.5% of students in the Class of 2006 went on to start a 4-year degree program (91 students in-state and 4 out of state), 46% went on to start a 2-year degree, 4.3% went on to start other vocational training programs, and 28 students total started employment immediately post graduation.

2008: 50 year golden anniversary
In 2008, Niagara-Wheatfield celebrated its "golden anniversary" of 50 years with a 1950s-style sock hop, inviting all NW alumni who have graduated from the school since its opening 50 years ago.

Brief history and student demographics
Prussian immigrant foundation:
The high school was built on the Haseley family farm land in 1958, which the family sold to the state. The dual Edward Town Middle School and Niagara-Wheatfield Senior High School complex is located on Saunders Settlement Road (NYS Route 31) near the hamlet of "Walmore", an original Franco-German (Prussian) Lutheran settlement formed in 1843, to which the Haseley family is related. There are still several families living in the town of Wheatfield today who are descendants of the original Franco-German (Prussian) immigrant families. The families established the hamlets of Saint Johnsburg, Bergholz, and Walmore after escaping harsh religious persecution in their former European homeland.

Tuscarora Nation history:
There is also a Native American population (the Tuscarora Nation, one of the Six Nations of Haudenosaunee) with a deep history that has a historical presence in the school district. The Tuscarora reservation (founded in 1803) is located directly across the street from the middle school and high school, and is home to the Tuscarora Nation.

Italian, Irish and other heritages:
The school district also is home to several students of Italian ancestry, as well as students many other diverse origins and backgrounds such as Irish-American, Asian-American and African-American.

A growing population in a difficult economy:
Despite issues with job loss in the manufacturing industry due to globalization and the transition of America from a manufacturing-driven economy into a service-driven economy, the Town of Wheatfield is one of the fastest-growing towns in Niagara County. West Street Elementary School located in Sanborn, NY was built and added to the school district in 1998 to accommodate the growing population of school-aged children.

References

External links

New York State School Boards Association

Education in Niagara County, New York
Education in Niagara Falls, New York
School districts in New York (state)
Schools in Niagara County, New York
School districts established in 1956